The 2020–21 Nemzeti Bajnokság I (also known as 2020–21 OTP Bank Liga), also known as NB I, is the 122nd season of top-tier football in Hungary. The league was officially named OTP Bank Liga for sponsorship reasons. Ferencváros were the defending champions.

Effects of the COVID-19 pandemic
On 16 August 2020, the match between Puskás Akadémia FC and Budapest Honvéd FC were postponed due to the fact that one player was tested positive for coronavirus.

Teams
Debrecen and Kaposvár finished the 2019–20 Nemzeti Bajnokság I in the last two places and thus were relegated to NB II division.

The two relegated teams were replaced with the top two teams in 2019–20 Nemzeti Bajnokság II, champion MTK and runner-up Budafok, each having the required licence for top-division play.

Stadium and locations
Following is the list of clubs competing in the league this season, with their location, stadium and stadium capacity.

Personnel and kits
All teams are obligated to have the logo of the league sponsor OTP Bank as well as the Nemzeti Bajnokság I logo on the right sleeve of their shirt. Hungarian national sports betting brand Tippmix sponsors all 12 teams of the first league since February 2019, their logo is therefore present on all team kits.

Note: Flags indicate national team as has been defined under FIFA eligibility rules. Players and Managers may hold more than one non-FIFA nationality.

Managerial changes

League table

Standings

Positions by round

The table lists the positions of teams after each week of matches. In order to preserve chronological evolvements, any postponed matches are not included to the round at which they were originally scheduled, but added to the full round they were played immediately afterwards.

Results

Rounds 1–22

Rounds 23–33

Statistics

Top goalscorers

Hat-tricks

4 Player scored four goals.

Number of teams by counties and regions

Awards

Monthly awards

Average attendances

See also
2020–21 Magyar Kupa
2020–21 Nemzeti Bajnokság II
2020–21 Nemzeti Bajnokság III

References

External links
  
 Official rules 
 uefa.com

Nemzeti Bajnokság I seasons
1
Hungary